Warsi or Warisi is a surname found among South Asian Muslims. Numerous disciples of Waris Ali Shah both Muslims and Hindus, add Warisi or Warsi to their names. It may refer to:

 Waris Ali Shah - Founder of Warsi Sufi order
 Anil Shukla Warsi (born 1957), Indian politician
 Arshad Warsi (born 1966), Indian actor
 Sayeeda Warsi, Baroness Warsi (born 1971), British politician
 Kamal Warsi, Pakistani leftist activist
 Muzaffar Warsi (1933–2011), Pakistani Urdu poet
 Nisha Warsi (born 1995), Indian field hockey player
 Perween Warsi (born 1956), British-Indian entrepreneur
 Raees Warsi (born 1963), Pakistani-American Urdu poet
 Ram Ekbal Singh Warsi (1922–2016), Indian freedom fighter and politician
 M J Warsi, Indian linguist, researcher and author
 Warsi Brothers, Indian qawwali musical group
 Ehsanulla Khan Warsi

See also 
 Warisi (king), 11th-century Hausa king in what is now northern Nigeria

References

Indian surnames
Surnames of Indian origin
Urdu-language surnames
Nisbas
Sunni Sufi orders